Abu Bakr Al-Aidarus (also spelled as Al-Aidrus, Al-Aydarus or Al-Idrus) is the name of several Hadhrami people:

 Abu Bakr al-Aydarus (1447–1508), patron saint of Aden and founder of the al-Aydarus clan 
 Abu Bakr al-Aydarus (Aceh), Tuan Besar of Aceh, lived in the 16th century
 Abu Bakr al-Aydarus (Indonesian scholar), Indonesian Sufi saint, Muslim scholar, and father of Hussain bin Abu Bakr Al-Aidarus (died 1798)